Hana Kvapilová (29 November 1860 — 8 April 1907) was a Czech actress.

Early life
Johanna Kubesch (Hana Kubešová) was born in Prague, the daughter of Gustav Kubeš.

Career
Kubešová became a member of the National Theatre in Prague in 1888. She was known for her Shakespearian roles, and for being the first Czech actress to play "Nora" in Ibsen's A Doll's House; she also played the lead in Hedda Gabler, "Masha" in Chekhov's Three Sisters, and "Helen" in her husband's The Will o' the Wisp. She was a friend and colleague to Czech composer Leoš Janáček, and Czech writer Alois Jirásek, among many others. 

She was awarded the Order of St. Sava for her stage work in Belgrade in 1902, and was compared to Italian actress Eleonora Duse: "Her grasp of character and range of expression were such as to have earned her the title of the Czech Duse."

Personal life
Hana Kubešová married writer and director Jaroslav Kvapil in 1894. She died in 1907, from complications related to diabetes; she had performed five days earlier, in Shakespeare's Much Ado About Nothing. She was 46 years old. After her death, Jaroslav Kvapil published her memoirs. Her ashes were buried in a park in Prague, and the site was marked with a statue of Kvapilová by Jan Štursa. She was featured on a Czech postage stamp in 1960.

References

External links
 Jaroslava Gregorová, "Hana Kubesova-Kvapilova" Radio Praha (April 5, 2001). (in French)

1860 births
1907 deaths
Czech stage actresses
Recipients of the Order of St. Sava
Actresses from Prague